Dorothea "Dosia" Alice Bennett (1914 – 6 May 1985) was a novelist and screenwriter married to Terence Young.

Early life
Bennett was daughter of Colonel William Bennett, DSO, OBE, MBChM, of Belbins, Romsey, Hampshire, who served in the Royal Army Medical Corps, and his wife Kate Eileen, dau. of Rev. James Johnston Stoney, of Tipperary, from a minor landed gentry family of Oakley Park, County Offaly, a branch of the Stoney family of Borrisokane from which also came Andrew Robinson Stoney. The Bennetts were from Clonakilty, County Cork, where her grandfather had been a doctor. Her brother, William Johnstone Stoney, was an Army Major.

Career
She is largely known for her 1977 novel The Jigsaw Man on which the 1983 film of the same name, directed by her husband, Terence Young, was based, as well as for other film work.

Personal life
She was married to the artist Francis Cook from 1933 to their divorce in 1935, in which year she married playwright and author Erik Martin Rüzt-Nissen, brother of the film and stage actress Greta Nissen. In 1942, she married the director Terence Young. Their son, Sean Terence Bowes Young (1943-2021), married the politician Diana Warwick, Baroness Warwick of Undercliffe. She died 6 May 1985 in Westminster, London, England.

Bibliography
 The Dry Taste of Fear (1960)
 Under the Skin (1961)
 The Jigsaw Man (1977)
 The Maynard Hayes Affair (1979)
 Greek Girl (1984)

References 

English spy fiction writers
British women screenwriters
English women novelists
1914 births
1985 deaths
Wives of baronets
20th-century English screenwriters
20th-century English women writers
20th-century English novelists